Tim Martinen (born 28 November 1999) is a Finnish professional footballer who plays for Atlantis as a midfielder.

References

External links
Tim Martinen at SPL

1999 births
Living people
Finnish footballers
FC Lahti players
Reipas Lahti players
AC Kajaani players
Atlantis FC players
Kakkonen players
Veikkausliiga players
Ykkönen players
Association football midfielders